Events in the year 2019 in Russia.

Incumbents
President: Vladimir Putin
Prime Minister: Dmitry Medvedev

Events

February – The Russian military launches a nationwide tour to parade war trophies from its intervention in the Syrian Civil War.
2-12 March – 2019 Winter Universiade
6 March – the Russian Federal Assembly passed a law criminalising publication of online statements that are found "indecent" or "disrespectful" towards Russian state or government officials (including the president), stipulating fines of up to 100,000 roubles for first-time offenders, and 200,000 roubles or up to 15 days imprisonment for repeat.
5 May – Aeroflot Flight 1492 crashes and bursts into flames at Sheremetyevo International Airport, killing 41 people on board.
8 August – Nyonoksa radiation accident
15 August – Ural Airlines Flight 178 crashed, all on board survived.
7 September – Filmmaker Oleg Sentsov and 66 others have been released in a prisoner exchange between Ukraine and Russia.

Births

 May 21, Tengku Ismail Leon Petra, son of the Muhammad V of Kelantan and Oksana Voevodina

Deaths

February

 February 3, Detsl, 35, Russian hip hop artist, heart attack.
 February 4, Evgeniy Aleksandrov, footballer (b.1952)
 February 8, Sergei Yursky, actor (b.1935)
 February 18, Valentina Dimitrieva, farm worker (b.1937).

March

 March 1, Zhores Alferov, scientist (b.1930)

April

 April 27, Aleksey Lebed, politician (b.1955)

May

 May 9, Sergei Dorenko, journalist (b.1959)

July

 July 3 – Arseny Mironov, aeronautical engineer (b. 1917)

See also

References

 
2010s in Russia
Years of the 21st century in Russia
Russia
Russia
Russia